Claudia DeMonte (born 1947) is an American mixed media artist known for her exploration of "contemporary women’s roles" and world cultures through her eclectic sculptures, collages, digital prints, and installations. Her work is influenced by growing up Catholic and the lavish trappings and rituals of Catholicism. Other significant interests and themes in her work include outsider art, "globalism, identity politics, feminism, and social responsibility," which have been shaped by her world travels as much as her awareness of social issues.

Early life

Claudia DeMonte was born in 1947 in Astoria, New York. She was raised in an ethnically diverse neighborhood where she had a traditional Italian upbringing and strong Catholic education. Her father was an insurance broker and honorary mayor of Astoria before becoming a city councilman. DeMonte's mother, Ammeda Heiss DeMonte, was an assistant buyer and "Miss Hub" for the Hub department store in Baltimore before she married and moved to New York where she became a community activist and vice chair of Community Board One.

Education

DeMonte received her Bachelor of Arts in art history from the College of Notre Dame in Baltimore in 1969 and her MFA from the Catholic University of America in Washington, D.C. in 1971. During her time at university, DeMonte was influenced by art historian Ruth Watkins and textile artist Nell Sonnemann as both women were independent, well-traveled, tall, and had no children.

The College of Santa Fe conferred an Honorary Doctorate on DeMonte in 2006.

Personal life

DeMonte married Ed McGowin, a fellow artist, in 1977. She currently lives and works in New York City and Miami, Florida.

Career

DeMonte became interested in conceptual art early in her career and was so impacted by Art Povera that she wrote a letter to Germano Celant asking to study with him. While at college, she was expected to focus on creating traditional types of art. Instead she conceived interactive exhibits, in which she traded T-shirts with her name based on the Delmonte logo, hand-decorated photos of herself, and objects that she collected. Requiring audience participation in order to work, her trading shows proved highly successful with her exhibition at the Baltimore Museum breaking an "attendance record at the time." Her first major break came when she was included in Jane Livingston's Liberation: Fourteen American Women Artists show that toured in Europe and Five Plus One, in which DeMonte was the "Plus One" as she was the only non-painter in the show.

In 1976, DeMonte returned to "using [her] hands" and began to make dolls. Her work was always "autobiographical" and "personal" as it often dealt with her family and growing up. That same year, DeMonte moved back to New York with McGowin after coming to the realization that the art scene in Washington, D.C. was not held in the same high regard as politics and was often seen as less than or "secondary". As a New Yorker, she also missed the "excitement" and "anonymity" that the city provided. While she had made connections, garnering interest and support in her work from the likes of gallerist Ron Feldman and Doug Davis after her one-person show at the Corcoran Gallery of Art, she struggled to gain a foothold in the New York art scene. There was a prevalent attitude that only New York museums and galleries carried any weight which DeMonte had not anticipated.

In 1977, returning to Queens, DeMonte rented a studio at P.S. 1 that furthered her connection with the New York art world. Her first significant press coverage came in the summer of 1980 after she had a reproduction in a group show. Determined to succeed in the New York art scene, she continued to take part in group shows that were often held at "alternative spaces". DeMonte's breakthrough finally came in 1983 after she joined Gracie Mansion’s successful new art gallery that was supportive of what she was trying to accomplish.

By the mid-1980s, the East Village art scene was flourishing and DeMonte was exhibiting her work nationally and internationally. During this time her artwork took on a new "universal" dimension while maintaining its deeply autobiographical qualities. This artistic development was facilitated by the extensive travel DeMonte undertook with McGowin. In a 1991 Smithsonian interview with Liza Kirwin, DeMonte stated that during the proceeding ten years, they had visited 50 countries and that a trip to the Deep South around 1985 furthered their interest in folk art and influenced her work and the materials she used.

DeMonte took on several notable projects in the 2000s. In 2000, she curated a collection of female artist works from 177 countries whose artwork depicted their personal understanding of what "woman" meant. Women of the World: A Global Collection of Art resulted in a 22-venue tour and a book published by Pomegranate. From 2000-2007, DeMonte's touring exhibition Real Beauty: A Celebration of Diversity and Global Culture, a collection of 140 traditional, handmade dolls by woman artists from around the world, explored the beauty standards and broader culture of each artist as well as the impact of globalism and mass-production on such objects.

Pomegranate released Claudia DeMonte in 2009 to accompany a retrospective tour of her work. The career monograph contained an essay by Eleanor Heartney, a contributing editor to Art in America and art press. The foreword was by president emerita of the Museum of Modern Art, Agnes Gund.

Teaching

DeMonte taught at the University of Maryland for 33 years. During her tenure, she was a recipient of the Distinguished Scholar Teacher Award in 1997 and the Students Award for Excellence in Teaching. She was named professor emerita when she retired in 2004. From 1980 until 1990, DeMonte was also in charge of the Art Workshop program at the New School for Social Research.

Exhibitions

Claudia DeMonte has more than 100 solo and 500 group exhibitions. Her work is also held in numerous private, public, and corporate collections around the world.

Select solo exhibitions

2020 
June Kelly Gallery, New York, N.Y.
2019 
Binomial: Claudia DeMonte & Ed McGowin, Lowe Art Museum, Miami, FL
2018 
Memento Vivere: Sculpture and Installations, June Kelly Gallery, New York
PARTNERS: Claudia DeMonte and Ed McGowin, Mattatuck Museum, Waterbury, CT
Cape Cod Museum, Dennis, MA
2017 
Celebrating 30 Years: Group Show Gallery Artists Drawings and Photographs, June Kelly Gallery, New York
2016 
Memory Keepers: Sculpture and Installations, June Kelly Gallery, New York 
The Art of Making the Invisible Visible: A Retrospective by Claudia DeMonte, Sarah Isom Center for Women and Gender Studies at the University of Mississippi, University MS
2014 
Claudia DeMonte: La Forza del Destino, June Kelly Gallery, New York
A Woman’s Work is Never Done, Five Points Gallery, Torrington, CT
Claudia DeMonte, Cullis Wade Depot Art Gallery, Mississippi State University, Starkville, MS
2012
Abundance: Sculpture/Installation, June Kelly Gallery, New York
2011 
Claudia DeMonte: Retrospective, Cora Miller Gallery, York College of Pennsylvania
Claudia DeMonte: Real Beauty, Cecille R. Hunt Gallery, Webster University, St. Louis, MO
Self and the Everywoman: Mixed Media Works by Claudia DeMonte, Trustman Art Gallery, Simmons College, Boston, MA
CLAUDIA DEMONTE - OPERA di DONNA, Marsh Hall, University of Southern Mississippi Museum of Art, Hattiesburg, MS
2010 
Claudia DeMonte, Nordstrand Gallery, Wayne State University, Wayne, NE
Mapping Beauty, Mobile Museum of Art, Mobile, AL
Real Beauty, Katzen Center for the Arts, American University, Washington, DC
Claudia DeMonte, Heffernan Gallery, West Valley Art Museum, Surprise, AZ
Claudia DeMonte: Mapping Beauty, Sarah Moody Gallery of Art, The University of Alabama, Tuscaloosa, AL
The Luxury of Exercise: Small Sculpture and Works on Paper by Claudia DeMonte, Mississippi Museum of Art, Jackson, MS
2009 
Claudia DeMonte: The Luxury of Exercise, June Kelly Gallery, New York, monograph with an essay by Eleanor Heartney and foreword by Agnes Gund, published by Pomegranate Books, San Francisco, CA
Claudia DeMonte and Ed McGowin, Jan Colle Gallery, Ghent, Belgium
Claudia DeMonte: Retrospective, University of New Haven, West Haven, CT
Everyday Matters, Flint Institute of Arts, MI
2008
Claudia DeMonte: Real Beauty, Kasser Family Exhibition, The Gottesman Libraries, Teachers College, Columbia University, New York
2007
Empowered Objects: New Sculpture, June Kelly Gallery, New York
Claudia DeMonte: Mapping Beauty, Holzhauer Gallery, Mattie Kelly Fine and Performing Arts Center, Okaloosa-Walton College, Niceville, FL
Mapping Beauty: 3 decades of installations, Makan Gallery, Amman, Jordan
2006
A Couple of Litchfield County Artists, Silo Gallery, New Milford, CT
Claudia DeMonte: A Silhouette, Selected Works, 1976–2005, University of Maryland, College Park, MD
Claudia DeMonte, Women’s Art Gallery, Cincinnati, OH
2005 
Claudia DeMonte, Contemporary Art Center, New Orleans, LA
Claudia DeMonte, Cole Pratt Gallery, New Orleans, LA
2004 
Retrospective, Tallinn Kunstihoone, Tallinn, Estonia
Claudia DeMonte, Gerdunberg Cultural Center, Reykjavik, Iceland
Personal Journeys, Salem College, Winston Salem, NC
2003 
Female Fetishes, International Museum of Women, San Francisco, CA
Claudia DeMonte, Spring Hill College, Mobile, AL
Claudia DeMonte, Brenau University, Gainesville, GA
Claudia DeMonte, Cole Pratt Gallery, New Orleans, LA
2002 
Female Fetishes, Museum of the Southwest, Midland, TX
2001 
Claudia DeMonte: New Work, Arguibel Gallery, Buenos Aires, Argentina
Female Fetishes, Tucson Museum of Art, Tucson, AZ
Claudia DeMonte: Retrospective, Rosemont College, PA
Female Fetishes, University of New England, Portland, ME
The Queen’s Dream: Site Specific, Islip Art Museum, East Islip, NY
2000 
Claudia DeMonte Female Implements, Flint Institute of Art, MI
1999 
Female Fetishes, Gallery Liesbeth Lips, Rotterdam, The Netherlands
1998 
Claudia DeMonte: Retrospective, Chokladfabriken, Malmo, Sweden
Female Fetishes, Ambleside Gallery, Richmond, VA
1997 
Female Fetishes, Genkan Gallery, Tokyo, Japan
Female Implements, Silpakorn University, Bangkok, Thailand
Claudia DeMonte, Gateway Center, Prudential Plaza, Newark, NJ
1996 
Domestique, Leedy Voulkos Gallery, Kansas City, MO
Female Implements: Serving Objects, Panorama Gallery, Winchester School of Art, Barcelona, Spain
1995 
Housewives, Xochipilli Gallery, Birmingham, MI
1994 
New Work, Barbara Gillman Gallery, Miami, FL
Significant Losses, The Art Gallery, University of Maryland, College Part, MD
1993 
Female Fetishes, Nina Freudenheim Gallery, Buffalo, NY
1992 
Objects of a Woman's Life, Jones/Troyer Fitzpatrick Gallery, Washington, DC
1991
Claudia DeMonte, Gallery 86, Lodz, Poland
1989 
Claudia DeMonte/Ed McGowin, Falcon Gallery, Riyada, Saudi Arabia
Shrines, Gracie Mansion Gallery, New York
1988 
Amphora, Jones/Troyer Gallery, Washington, DC
1986 
New Work: Two Installations, Xochipilli Gallery, Birmingham, MI
Windows, Grey Art Gallery, New York University
1985
Claudia at Home & Abroad, Gracie Mansion Gallery, New York 
1983 
Russell Sage Gallery, Albany, NY
1982 
Shipka Gallery, Sofia, Bulgaria
1981 
Marion Locks Gallery, Philadelphia, PA
1980 
Mississippi Museum of Art, Jackson, MS
Fort Worth Museum, Fort Worth, Texas
1979 
Marianne Deson Gallery, Chicago, IL
1978 
Trade Piece, Contemporary Art Center, New Orleans; Baltimore Museum of Art; Franklin Furnace, New York City, NY; American Cultural Center, Paris
1977 
Corcoran Gallery of Art, Washington D.C.

Select group exhibitions

Un Incontro a Venezia, Archivo, Emily Harvey, Venice, Italy
50 Works from the Vogel Collection:
Honolulu Museum of Art, Hawaii
Portland Museum of Art
Mississippi Museum of Art
Marjorie Barrick Museum of Art, University of Nevada, Las Vegas
University of Michigan Art Museum, Ann Arbor
Atrium Gallery, St. Louis, Missouri
Markers 8: Mapping, Art life for the World Gallery, Venice, Italy
Journee Internationale de la femme, UNESCO, Paris, France
Beauty, University of Wisconsin, Milwaukee, Wisconsin
14 American Artists, Aarhus Museum, Denmark
American Artists, Arseanle de Repulbica, Amalfi, Italy
American Narrative Art, Contemporary Art Museum, Houston, Texas
Biennial, Indianapolis Museum
Comic Description of Sex in Contemporary Art, Gallery Im Haus 19, Munich, Germany
HOME, Contemporary Art Museum, Sao Paolo
International Paper Biennial Duren Museum, Germany
Markers Project, Via Garibaldi, Venice, Italy
Model Home, The Stanley Picher Gallery, Kingston University, Surrey, England
New Painting New York, P.S. l, New York
New York Now, Espo Museum, Finland
Site Specific, Islip Museum
The New York Scene, Liesbeth Lips Gallery, Rotterdam, the Netherlands
Third International Biennial of Graphic Arts, Bitola, Macedonia

Projects

2019-20 The World is a Handkerchief, curated by Cecilia Mandrile and Claudia DeMonte, touring exhibition
2015 Between the Lines: A Coloring Book by Contemporary Artists, Volume 5
2000-07	Real Beauty: A Celebration of Diversity and Global Culture, touring exhibition
2000-07	Women of the World: A Global Collection of Art, national and international exhibition

Select public collections

Bass Museum
Boca Raton Museum
Brooklyn Museum of Art
Corcoran Gallery of Art 
Delaware Art Museum 
Flint Institute of Arts 
Fort Lauderdale Museum 
Indianapolis Museum of Art 
The Katzen Arts Center, American University, Washington, DC
Lowe Art Museum, University of Miami
Marjorie Barrick Museum of Art, University of Nevada
Mattatuck Museum
Minnesota Museum of American Art
Mississippi Museum
Mobile Museum of Art 
New Orleans Museum of Art
Ogden Museum
Queens Museum
Stamford Museum
University of Michigan Museum of Art

Honors and awards 

DeMonte has been the recipient of numerous honors and awards.

2014 Winner, The Fabergé Big Egg Hunt for "Golden Egg," New York City
2014 "Best in Feminist Art & Scholarship" for the exhibition "La Forza del Destino" by the CAA Committee on Women in the Arts, New York
2006 Doctor of Humane Letters, Honoris, Causa, College of Santa Fe. NM
2005 Professor Emerita, University of Maryland, College Park, MD
Grant, Ennessi Foundation, Saudi Arabia
Grant, Cantor Family Foundation, New York
2003 Art Award, Mobile Museum of Art, AL
1999 Grant, Anchorage Foundation Inc. of Texas, Houston. TX 
Arts Award Grant, Creative and Performing, University of Maryland, College Park, MD
Arts Award, Euro-American Women’s Council, Athens, Greece
1998 Design Award for "Installation of The Wheel of Justice by Claudia DeMonte & Ed McGowan," City of New York
1997 Distinguished Scholar/Teacher, University of Maryland, College Park, MD 
1989 New York Foundation for the Arts Fellowship, Sculpture
Ariana Foundation for the Arts, Percent for Art 
Cite Des Arts Residency, Paris, France (date unknown)
U.S. Representative, International Women's Art Conference, Kingston, Jamaica (date unknown)

Commissions 

2006-08 Commitment to Valor, Courageous Rescue, Bravery for Others, and Heroic Protectors, Broward County Fire Rescue, Florida Cultural Society, Ft. Lauderdale, FL
2004-06 Santa Rosa Fountain, commissioned for the city of Santa Rosa by New Mexico State Arts, Santa Rosa, NM
2002-04 We Are One, University of Northern Iowa, Iowa City, IA
2001 Untitled, commissioned by Peter Marino, Architect, PLLC, Palm Beach, FL
1998 Socorro Wheel of History, commissioned by New Mexico State Arts, Socorro, NM
Wheel of Justice, commissioned by the New York City Department of Cultural Affairs, Queens Supreme Court, Flushing Meadows
1993 Animal Count, commissioned by Percent for Art Program of the New York City Department of Cultural Affairs/School Construction Authority, Queens
1992 Fantasy Travels, Prudential Life Insurance, Parsippany, NJ
Claudia DeMonte Ceramic Tableware, Grazia Studios, Deruta, Italy
1990 Shrine to Learning, Clarendon Public Library, commissioned by Brooklyn Public Library System, Percent for Art Program of the New York City and Department of Cultural Affairs, NY
1984 Untitled, sculpture, Hyatt Regency Hotel, Crystal City, VA
1981 Travel Fantasy, Prudential Life Insurance, Parsippany, NJ
1972 Untitled, Philadelphia Museum of Art, PA
1970 Mural, Bladen Hall, Prince George’s Community College, Largo, MD Mural, Astoria Park, Queens, New York City Park Department

References

External links

1947 births
Living people
People from Astoria, Queens
Artists from New York City
Mixed-media artists
20th-century American sculptors
21st-century American sculptors
American women sculptors
American installation artists
American conceptual artists
University System of Maryland faculty
20th-century American women artists
American women academics
21st-century American women artists